Amaranthus crassipes, also known as spreading amaranth, is a glabrous annual plant that is both native and introduced in the United States.  In the U.S., it is found in New Mexico, Arizona, Texas, Alabama, South Carolina, and Louisiana.  It is also found in Mexico, the West Indies, and South America.

The plant can grow up to two feet in height.  It flowers in the summer and fall.  It is usually found near wet habitats or disturbed areas.

Two varieties of A. crassipes have been described:  A. crassipes var. crassipes and A. crassipes var. warnockii. The major difference appears to be the leaf structure.

References

crassipes
Flora of the Southeastern United States
Flora of the South-Central United States
Flora of Mexico
Flora of Arizona
Flora of the Caribbean
Flora of Colombia
Flora of Venezuela